Richard Thomas James Howell (born 2 January 1982) is an English cricketer.  Howell is a right-handed batsman who bowls right-arm medium pace and who occasionally plays as a wicketkeeper.  He was born in Gloucester, Gloucestershire and was educated at Cheltenham College.

Howell represented the Gloucestershire Cricket Board in 3 List A matches.  These came against the Nottinghamshire Cricket Board in the 2000 NatWest Trophy and Huntingdonshire and the Yorkshire Cricket Board in the 1st and 2nd rounds of the 2002 Cheltenham & Gloucester Trophy which were both held in 2002.  In his 3 List A matches, he scored 35 runs at a batting average of 35.00, with a high score of 20*.  With the ball he took a single wicket at a bowling average of 35.00, with best figures of 1/35.

References

External links
Richard Howell at Cricinfo
Richard Howell at CricketArchive

1982 births
Living people
Cricketers from Gloucester
English cricketers
Gloucestershire Cricket Board cricketers